Ptelea crenulata, commonly known as the California hoptree, is a species of tree that is endemic to the state of California in the United States. It is found in the western Sierra Nevada and southern Cascade Range foothills, the northern California Coast Ranges, and the San Francisco Bay Area.

The plant grows in chaparral and woodlands habitats. It is cultivated by specialty California native plant nurseries as an ornamental plant for use as a shrub or small tree in  water conserving gardens, natural landscaping design, and habitat restoration projects.

References

External links

Zanthoxyloideae
Endemic flora of California
Trees of the Southwestern United States
Flora without expected TNC conservation status